ZEE5 is an Indian on-demand Internet streaming media provider run by Zee Entertainment Enterprises. It was launched in India on 14 February 2018 with content in 12 languages. The service has distributed a number of original programs, including original series, specials, miniseries, documentaries and films.

2018

2019

2020

2021

2022

2023

See also
List of Amazon India originals
List of Hotstar original films
List of Disney+ Hotstar original programming
List of SonyLIV original programming
List of Netflix India originals

References 

ZEE5 original programming